Frans Schrofer (born 15 August 1956) is a Dutch furniture designer and industrial designer based in The Hague, Netherlands. He received a technical education in Leiden and then studied at the Design Academy Eindhoven, graduating in 1983 and founding his own design studio, Studio Schrofer, in 1984. He is known for a sculptural approach to furniture design, conscious use of materials, practicality, ergonomics, technical knowledge and for pioneering a modern, design-led approach to garden furniture styles.

Education and early career
Schrofer's early education included metalwork, auto mechanics, electro-mechanics and mechanical engineering. Supplementing his formal education, from the age of 12, Schrofer was mentored by the sculptor, Frans de Wit. During this time the young Schrofer acted as de Wit's artistic assistant, developing an awareness of sculptural style in the process. "Frans de Wit taught me to focus on form, materials and emotions," Schrofer said in an interview in 1995. After his technical education in Leiden, he went on to study at the  Design Academy Eindhoven, graduating in 1983. After graduation, Schrofer's first job was as a packaging designer with Stadium Design in Hillegom. It is during this time that he learned the importance of emotive shape, color association, hand-feel textures and consumer product testing.

In 1984 Schrofer set up his own design studio in The Hague, Netherlands. Studio Schrofer received its first commission from the Dutch firm, Young International, an association that would last for several, productive years and bring Schrofer widespread recognition as a rising young talent in the Netherlands. By 2000, Schrofer designs in lighting, office furniture, and indoor and outdoor furniture were being sold internationally. As of 2012, Studio Schrofer designed products sell in 126 countries.

Furniture design

As well as sculptural quality, Schrofer's furniture designs are known for their practicality, conscious use of materials and ergonomic principles.

One of his most well known early designs is the Scudo chair (for Young International). Inspired by slow relaxed movement and shape of turtle ('scudo' means 'shield' in Italian), the  reclining armchair was one of the most commercially successful for the manufacturer. Schrofer explored bending, stretching, pulling materials and forms in self-expressive shapes and multi-functionality for Scudo. The paws of Scudo use natural materials, like wood, and the headrest is magnetically attached.

The Formi chair, first launched in 2002 for Leolux, is another key design of Schrofer's. It is based on the structure of a working bee and a few years later, for Formi Phase II, Schrofer further innovated the design to incorporate a rotary continuous passive motion (RCPM) industrial seating mechanism (used for spinal rotation).

Schrofer has designed for Dutch furniture manufacturers such as Leolux, Metaform, Harvink, Hartman Outdoor Products and Bree's New World, as well as international brands such as:
 Durlet (Belgium)
 Felice Rossi, Casprini, Molinari, Natuzzi (Italian)
 Stern, Domus Ventures, Kettler, (Germany).

Garden furniture design
In 1998, Schrofer approached the Dutch-managed, Chinese-based trade house, Xindao, and English teak garden firm, Lister Teak 1874 (part of the Sun Wood Group), with designs for mixed material garden furniture collections. Schrofer foresaw that Asia could provide inexpensive labour and a range of raw materials suitable for contemporary designs – designs that matched architecture and lifestyles with dissolved borders between inside and outside, home and work. He was successful: five collections designed by Schrofer for those manufacturers were, in 2000, simultaneously introduced at SPOGA, the annual sport and garden trade fair held in Cologne, Germany. The collections included the Garden Signature Collection (by Frans Schrofer for Xindao) and the Cannes Collection of teak slats with satinised stainless steel from Sun Wood Group. Immediate international placements catapulted Schrofer's reputation in garden furniture design.

Lighting and other works
Early on in his career, Schrofer's created several lighting designs (for Dutch firm, Scopelight, and Indoor of Amsterdam) including the Plume (1990), a lamp whose metal components were so intricate that the precision engineering skills of instrument makers had to be used for manufacture.
In 2010, he returned to lighting design to work with Austrian firm, XAL. For them, he created two designs:
 Corona: inspired by the shining ring of light of a solar eclipse, cast in aluminium and incorporating a ring of high-efficiency LED lights. The diameter of 1001mm is based on old, mathematical and mythical principles.
 Liquid: an armature shape in a fluid-like form, made with a rubber pressing technique.

Demonstrating his strong technical understanding, Schrofer has also designed several, eco-friendly firespaces for Dutch firm, Safretti (a firespace being a bio-ethynol fuelled hearth that doesn’t require a flu or chimney). The OlympiQ incorporates a high efficiency, wood burning (Philips) technology to create a multifunctional - fireplace and barbecue - design. A bio-ethanol fuel reservoir provides clean burning flames and, for optimum wood burning and minimal residue, a thermally conductive Peltier-element transforms the heat to energy that recharges the batteries to the air flow motor.

In 2011, Schrofer approached the historic Dutch gin manufacturer, van Kleef, with an idea to innovate the product's packaging, suitable for use as a gift representing the city of The Hague. Using a traditional ceramic manufacturing technique, Schrofer designed two distinctively shaped bottles to differentiate the old gin (oude) from the young (jonge) distilling process, together with matching shot glasses.

Schrofer has also designed glassware, tables, storage cabinets and a chess set.

Awards and honours

 In 1992 his Trivette table won an honourable mention for the Dutch Design Award, for its use of laser-cutting steel technology. Schrofer designed the table for Hennie de Jong, taking his inspiration from insect legs.
 In 2004, Vice-President of the Council of State, Herman Tjeenk Willink, commissioned Studio Schrofer to create a diplomatic gift during the Dutch Presidency of the Council of the European Union.
 In 2008, Five Schrofer designs received North Sea Pearl Awards, including Pastille (Leolux), Palms (Lister Teak) and OlympiQ (Safretti).
 In 2010, the Chicago Athenaeum Museum of Architecture and Design, in cooperation with The European Centre for Architecture, Art, Design and Urban Studies, awarded a Good Design Award to Schrofer's OlympiQ firespace and barbecue. In the same year, the OlympiQ also received a German Interior Innovation Award from the German Design Council.
 In 2010 the city of The Hague Urban Planning Department appointed Studio Schrofer as a Creative Ambassador.
 In 2015, the Caruzzo recliner, designed by Frans Schrofer and manufactured by Leolux, was awarded a Red Dot Award for product design. The Caruzzo is a swivel/tilt chair with a strong form and broad shoulders. It is equipped with a tilting mechanism that you can lock in any position. The laced seam ‘Artisan’ on the back is manually applied by Leolux upholsterers.

Teaching
Schrofer is committed to accelerating the connections and commitments between design manufacturers and design education institutions, teaching that design is an inter-connected chain of disciplines.

From 1987-2002 Schrofer taught at the Royal Academy of Art in The Hague instructing on three-dimensional packaging and he served on the advisory committee for the Industrial Product Development Department of The Hague University from 2000-2005. Schrofer has also consulted at Rotterdam University of Applied Sciences' Master's Program for Industrial Design from 2007-2010. Schrofer has been active in the enforcement of stricter international intellectual property laws, as relating to design, and has lectured on this at the International Furniture Fair (CIFF) in Guangzhou, China in 2009 and 2010. Still a keen advocate for developing local talent, in 2012 Schrofer lectured for the Dutch organisation, Cultuur Ondernemen, which seeks to encourage entrepreneurship amongst artists and cultural creatives.

Family background
Schrofer was raised in Voorschoten, Netherlands, into a family of artists. Frans' father, Willem Schrofer, was a teacher at the Royal Academy of Art and the founder of the Nieuwe Haagse School movement. His mother, Hannie Bal, was a student at the Academy and later a member of the Verve group. His uncle, Jan Schrofer, was the founder of the furniture factory, The Circle (later to become the market leader, Ahrend), in Zwanenberg, Netherlands and was renowned for his collaboration with Friso Kramer in the development of the Revolt chair. Frans' half brother, Jurriaan Schrofer, was a renowned graphic designer and the Director of the Art Academy in Arnhem. Jurriaan's son, Gilian Schrofer, established both Concrete, an architecture agency in Amsterdam, and the Schrofer Academie, the only accredited Interior Design Masters program in Europe. Schrofer's cousin, Janwillem, was the Director of the Rijks Academy from 1983-2010.

Personal life

Schrofer lives in The Hague, Netherlands. He is married to Sonia Sin and has two daughters. Schrofer owns a Citroën SM Maserati and is an auto racing enthusiast. According to Schrofer, "Car designers have always been trend setters ... they use more and more expressive, organic forms. Look, for instance, at the integration of the headlights in the hood. I believe that furniture design will follow this curvy trend."

See also
 Ecodesign
 Emotional Design by Donald Norman
 Furniture design
 Sustainable design

References

External links

1956 births
Living people
Dutch furniture designers
People from Voorburg
Academic staff of The Hague University of Applied Sciences